Hanover is a census-designated place in Coosa County, Alabama, United States. 

Hanover is likely named for Hanover, Virginia. 

A post office operated under the name Hanover from 1847 to 1907.

The Hanover Schist is named for Hanover.

It was first named as a CDP in the 2020 Census which listed a population of 151.

Demographics

2020 census

Note: the US Census treats Hispanic/Latino as an ethnic category. This table excludes Latinos from the racial categories and assigns them to a separate category. Hispanics/Latinos can be of any race.

References

Census-designated places in Alabama
Census-designated places in Coosa County, Alabama